Kiyanilie Peseyie (1 August 1941 – 27 September 2017) was an Indian politician from Nagaland, India. Between 1971 and 2002 he was in government service. He took voluntary retirement as the Additional Commissioner of Excise, Nagaland and entered politics. In 2003 he was elected to the Legislative Assembly of Nagaland, as the Naga People's Front candidate in the constituency Western Angami (ST). After the election, he was elected as Speaker of the Legislative Assembly. He retained his constituency in the 2008 election, and was then elected Speaker for a second term.  In 2013 he  was made the Minister for Public Health Engineering after retaining his constituency for a third time however in a minor reshuffle he was made the minister for Social Security & Welfare Department and Parliamentary Affairs. He was appointed as the Chief Whip of the Naga People’s Front Legislature. He was the first from North East India to be appointed as an executive member of the Commonwealth Parliamentary Association. 

He died on 27 September 2017 around 2.30 A.M. at Zion Hospital Dimapur after a brief illness. On 28 September, he was laid to rest in Jotsoma village with full state honors.

References

Nagaland MLAs 2003–2008
Naga People's Front politicians
 People from Kohima
1947 births
2017 deaths
Speakers of the Nagaland Legislative Assembly
Nagaland MLAs 2008–2013